Polyhymno palinorsa is a moth of the family Gelechiidae. It was described by English entomologist Edward Meyrick in 1909. It is found in Namibia and South Africa (Limpopo, Mpumalanga, Gauteng).

The wingspan is about 13 mm. The forewings are dark fuscous with a moderate white median longitudinal streak from the base to the termen, becoming linear posteriorly. There is a fine white line immediately beneath the costa from near the base to the middle, then running obliquely into the median streak near the termen and there is a white sub-dorsal line from near the base almost to the tornus. A white line is found along the submedian fold posteriorly almost rising out of the median streak. There is also a white somewhat upwards-oblique streak lying between the posterior half of this and the median streak and an oblique white line from the costa about two-thirds to the apex of the median streak, the extremity greyish. A pale ochreous-yellowish streak runs from above the posterior portion of this to the apex. The hindwings are grey.

References

Moths described in 1909
Polyhymno